Pyllini ( or Πυλήνη) is a former municipality in Aetolia-Acarnania, West Greece, Greece. Since the 2011 local government reform it is part of the municipality Nafpaktia, of which it is a municipal unit. The municipal unit has an area of 123.966 km2. Population 857 (2011). The seat of the municipality was in Simos.

Subdivisions
The municipal unit Pyllini is subdivided into the following communities (constituent villages in brackets):
Famila (Platanias, Sykea, Famila)
Anthofyto (Anthofyto, Leptokarya)
Gavros (Gavros, Koutsogiannaiika)
Dorvitsa
Eleftheriani
Milea
Palaiopyrgos (Palaiopyrgos, Perivolia)
Pokista
Simos (Simos, Kampos, Palaiochori)
Stranoma (Stranoma, Ano Kampos, Kato Kampos, Loutra Stachtis)
Stylia (Stylia, Agia Tiada)

References

Populated places in Aetolia-Acarnania
Nafpaktia